Gunampalli Raghava Reddy is a businessman, religious leader and a nationalist from Kurnool, Andhra Pradesh, India, best known for Pulla Reddy Sweets, chain of retail sweet outlets in Hyderabad and Kurnool. 

He was the international president of the Hindu organization Vishwa Hindu Parishad (VHP). 

He and his wife Bharathi Reddy and also his younger son Eknath Reddy are facing charges for attempt to murder and assault on their daughter-in-law and their 7 year old grand daughter. They are also facing allegations of dowry.

References

Telugu people
Living people
Rashtriya Swayamsevak Sangh pracharaks
Year of birth missing (living people)
People from Kurnool
Businesspeople from Andhra Pradesh
President of Vishva Hindu Parishad